Vicco Airport  is a very high elevation airport serving the mining town of Vicco in the Pasco Region of Peru.

See also

Transport in Peru
List of airports in Peru

References

External links
OpenStreetMap - Vicco
OurAirports - Vicco
SkyVector - Vicco
Vicco Airport

Airports in Peru
Buildings and structures in Pasco Region